HMS Phoenix was a  sloop launched in 1879. She was wrecked off Prince Edward Island, Canada on 12 September 1882.

Design
The Doterel class was designed by Nathaniel Barnaby as a development of William Henry White's 1874 . The graceful clipper bow of the Ospreys was replaced by a vertical stem and the engines were more powerful. The hull was of composite construction, with wooden planks over an iron frame.

Propulsion

Armament
Ships of the class were armed with two 7-inch (90 cwt) muzzle-loading rifled guns on pivoting mounts, and four 64-pounder muzzle-loading rifled guns (two on pivoting mounts, and two broadside). Four machine guns and one light gun completed the weaponry.

Sail plan
All the ships of the class were provided with a barque rig, that is, square-rigged foremast and mainmast, and fore-and-aft sails only on the mizzen mast.

Crew
Phoenix would have had a normal complement of 140–150 men.

Construction
Phoenix was ordered from Devonport Dockyard and laid down on 8 July 1878. She was launched on 16 September 1879 and commissioned on 20 April 1880.

Service
Sloops of her type were designed for patrolling Britain's extensive maritime empire, and were normally sent to foreign stations for extended periods. Typically the crews would serve commissions of several years before handing their ship over to a newly arrived crew and returning home in another ship.  Phoenix was sent to the North America and West Indies Station.

Wreck

Phoenix left Gaspé, Quebec on the morning of 12 September 1882 under the command of Commander Hubert Grenfell. The wind was a north-east gale and the sea was thick with rain squalls. As she approached East Point from the north-west, under short sail and in the dark, the distance to East Point Light was judged to be 4 or 5 miles.

The whole of 13 September was spent trying to save the ship, but the sea was too rough for boats to travel between the ship and the land. By 14 September 4 local fishermen were able to take a boat to Phoenix, which by now was sitting upright on the reef and flooded to the deck. Grenfell ordered the boats and rafts to make for the shore, and everybody on board was landed safely.

Northampton was recalled by telegram from Halifax and brought with her Rear Admiral Sir Francis Leopold McClintock, the commander-in-chief of the North America and West Indies Station. The weather remained poor, and it was not until 19 September that the ship's company of Phoenix could be embarked. With the help of two small vessels, Foam and Charger, Phoenixs guns and heavy equipment were salvaged, but it was clear that the ship could not be refloated, and the salvage rights to the wreck were sold for £3,000.

The board of enquiry found that insufficient efforts had been made to establish the range of the light, and that the courses steered had been hazardous. Commander Grenfell was given a severe reprimand and dismissed ship, Lieutenant John Hill, the navigating officer, forfeited a year's seniority, and the gunner was reprimanded.

The wreck can be dived, although strong tidal streams make the area dangerous for all but the most experienced.

Notes

References

External links

Sources 

 

Doterel-class sloops
Victorian-era sloops of the United Kingdom
1879 ships
Ships built in Plymouth, Devon
Maritime incidents in September 1882
Shipwrecks of the Prince Edward Island coast